The 1878 Grey Valley by-election was a by-election held on 22 May 1878 during the 6th New Zealand Parliament in the West Coast electorate of .

The by-election was caused by the resignation of the incumbent MP Martin Kennedy on 13 April 1878.

The by-election was won by Richard Reeves. 
 
He was opposed by William Henry Harrison (who had been elected for the electorate in the ) and John Barrowman; Heber Newton withdrew but got 25 votes.

Results
The following table gives the election result:

Notes

Grey Valley 1878
1878 elections in New Zealand
May 1878 events
Grey District
Politics of the West Coast, New Zealand